Jacques-Cartier is an electoral district in the West Island of Montreal, Canada, that elects members to the National Assembly of Quebec.  It is the only provincial electoral district in Quebec with an Anglophone majority. It notably includes the city of Pointe-Claire.

Named after Jacques Cartier, the district existed in the Legislative Assembly of the Province of Canada, and its present incarnation dates from the 1867 election.

In 2011, district boundaries were redrawn, and part of Kirkland was transferred to Nelligan, in exchange for Senneville.

Members of the Legislative Assembly / National Assembly

Electoral results

* Result compared to Action démocratique

|-

|No designation
|Daniel Cormier-Roach
|align="right"|49
|align="right"|0.14
|align="right"|–
|}

|-

|Socialist Democracy
|Eugène Busque
|align="right"|217
|align="right"|0.55
|align="right"|–
|}

|-

|Natural Law
|Maurice Bergeron
|align="right"|206
|align="right"|0.52
|align="right"|–
|-

|CANADA!
|Gilles Florent Pepin
|align="right"|186
|align="right"|0.47
|align="right"|–
|-

|Economic
|Karl Berryman
|align="right"|94
|align="right"|0.24
|align="right"|–
|-

|}

|-
 
|Liberal
|Joan Dougherty
|align="right"|14,019
|align="right"|41.52
|align="right"|-38.84

|-

|-

|New Democratic
|Thomas Ezzy
|align="right"|228
|align="right"|0.68
|align="right"|-2.72
|-
 
|Independent
|Neal Ford
|align="right"|192
|align="right"|0.57
|align="right"|–
|-
 
|Independent
|Howard Galganov
|align="right"|50
|align="right"|0.15
|align="right"|–
|}

References

External links
Information
 Elections Quebec

Election results
 Election results (National Assembly)
 Election results (QuébecPolitique)

Maps
 2011 map (PDF)
 2001 map (Flash)
2001–2011 changes (Flash)
1992–2001 changes (Flash)
 Electoral map of Montréal region
 Quebec electoral map, 2011

Beaconsfield, Quebec
Pointe-Claire
Quebec provincial electoral districts
Sainte-Anne-de-Bellevue, Quebec